"Won't Be Broken" is a song by English alternative rock band Keane, released on 20 January 2014 as the second single from the band's first compilation album, The Best of Keane.

Composition and recording

"Won't Be Broken" is "an emotionally honest, piano led song about battling difficult times with determination and hope." The song was recorded during the recording sessions for the band's fourth studio album, Strangeland, released in May 2012.

Charts

References

Keane (band) songs
2014 singles
2013 songs
Island Records singles
Songs written by Tim Rice-Oxley
Songs written by Tom Chaplin
Songs written by Richard Hughes (musician)
Songs written by Jesse Quin